Sleng Teng is the name given to one of the first fully computerized riddims, influential in Jamaican music and beyond. The riddim, which was the result of work by Noel Davey, Ian "Wayne" Smith, and Lloyd "King Jammy" James, was first released with Wayne's vocals under the title "Under Mi Sleng Teng" in early 1985.

Composition 
In mid-1984 Jamaican musician George "Buddy" Haye went on tour to the United States with the Wailing Souls. Before he left Jamaica, Buddy had promised a young musician named Noel Davey that he would buy a synthesizer while in the United States and bring it back to him. Wailing frontman Rudolph "Garth" Dennis had recommended Davey as an up-and-coming talent to foster. Although Davey was expecting a programmable synthesizer (he had been promised a Yamaha DX7) Garth delivered a consumer-grade Casiotone MT-40 keyboard. This keyboard only held recordings of sound, triggered by user input, rather than waveform generators whose outputs can be extensively modified, as on more expensive keyboards like the DX7 (the 1984 retail price of the DX7 was $1,995, almost fourteen times the cost of the MT-40).  

Undeterred, Davey and fellow musician Wayne Smith played with the keyboard for several weeks. One day Davey accidentally triggered the "rock" bassline preset, which he heard for a few seconds before the keyboard setting was changed and the rhythm ceased playing. He and Wayne spent most of the next week trying combination after combination of the Casio's settings until Davey re-discovered the "rock" bass preset. The preset is accessed by pressing the "synchro" button and then the "D" bass button (second from left) while the MT-40 rhythm selector slider is in the "rock" position. It cannot be triggered after the rhythm function has been started.

Davey and Wayne Smith arranged the first version of the Sleng Teng riddim, which was considerably faster than the final release. Smith then rehearsed a toast over the riddim, with lyrics inspired by Barrington Levy's "Under Mi Sensi" and Yellowman's "Under Me Fat Ting". Davey and Smith brought the riddim and toast to noted producer and dub mixer King Jammy in December of 1984. Jammy slowed the riddim down, matched it to Smith's singing key and placed piano and clap tracks over it. 

While Jammy recalled knowing immediately that he had helped create something special once he listened to the final mix, he also said he was still completely unprepared for the response to Sleng Teng's first public performance. The song was unleashed as part of a now-legendary sound clash between Jammy's own sound system and the Black Scorpio at Waltham Park Road on February 23, 1985. Jammy won the clash by acclamation, with the audience demanding "Under Me Sleng Teng" be played over and over.

Jammy formally released this version a week later as a single on his own label. Jammy also recorded a number of other artists (in addition to Wayne Smith) on this Sleng Teng backing track. These included Tenor Saw (with "Pumpkin Belly") and Johnny Osbourne (with "Buddy Bye"). The Sleng Teng riddim went on to spawn nearly 500 cover versions. Its success is widely credited with single-handedly transitioning reggae from analog to computerized production. This transition to digital music production using synthesizers, drum machines and samplers follows the computerization of hip-hop music, which, like reggae, had been recorded with a band and traditional music instruments. Given the lasting consequences of the Sleng Teng riddim, the MT-40's "rock" preset has been the subject of considerable speculation.

The MT-40 "rock" preset 
The famous preset was composed in 1980 by a then newly-hired music engineer at Casio, Okuda Hiroko. She was assigned to create several of the MT-40 consumer keyboard's presets, among them a "rock" rhythm. Okuda had been hired fresh out of music school, where she had produced one of Japan's first graduate theses on reggae. In 2022 she described herself as having been immersed in reggae for several years before her 1980 hire by Casio (the previous year, during Bob Marley's only visit to Japan, Okuda had attended more than three performances from the tour). Tellingly, the "rock" preset is not usable at a normal rock and roll tempo (around 172 bpm). Only when the tempo knob is turned down to the 80-110 bpm range, home to reggae and dub, does it become possible to play an accompaniment to the "rock" preset. Okuda only learned of her part in "Under Me Sleng Teng"'s global success in August of 1986, when she read an article titled “The Sleng Teng Flood” in Japan's Music Magazine. The article described the wave of dozens and dozens of reggae songs being produced in Jamaica, all based on a Casiotone keyboard preset.

After the worldwide success of Sleng Teng many speculated as to the ultimate source of the "rock" preset. At first Eddie Cochran's 1958 song "Somethin' Else" or the Sex Pistols' 1976 track "Anarchy in the UK" were thought to be prime candidates, with "Somethin' Else" being widely accepted for decades by connoisseurs. In 2015 Okuda was quoted as saying the source was a track on an unnamed 1970s British rock album. This was later speculated to be the intro to David Bowie's "Hang On to Yourself", the 8th track on his 1972 album The Rise and Fall of Ziggy Stardust and the Spiders from Mars. However, referring to the question in 2022, Okuda said, “I did use to listen to a lot of British rock, so I’m sure there must have been songs that influenced me. But really, the bassline was something I came up with myself. It wasn’t based on any other tune.”

According to Okuda, there was some talk at the Casio corporation of attempting to defend their intellectual property from its free use in "Under Me Sleng Teng" with lawsuits. However, other voices at Casio (among them the head of the Musical Instrument division, co-founder of the company, and second-eldest Kashio brother, Toshio Kashio) prevailed. Toshio Kashio in particular felt strongly that the company's mission ought to be “bringing the pleasure of playing a musical instrument to everyone.” Despite the minute size and financial importance of the Musical Instrument division compared to the company's calculator division, then its main breadwinner, Toshio Kashio's defence of free use set a decisive corporate precedent. To the present day Casio's response to clearance requests for the "rock" preset has been an acknowledgement that the song “uses a sound file taken from a Casio MT-40”, and no fee.

The preset is accessed by pressing the "synchro" button and then the "D" bass button (second from left) while the MT-40 rhythm slider is in the "rock" position.

Influence
Scholars Peter Manuel and Wayne Marshall argue that Sleng Teng "was seminal in various ways ... [it] further consolidated the trend toward the new production of riddims based on short ostinatos, rather than reliance on vintage B-side tracks, with their occasionally problematic chord progressions." Secondly, it sounded thoroughly novel and different from the "overused Studio One classics". Third, its success promoted the wide use of digital production methods, where "a keyboard synthesizer, sequencer, and drum machine, or access to these, could generate a new riddim, without having to spend money on studio time or studio musicians."

Sleng Teng is among the most versioned (rerecorded) of Jamaican riddims, with nearly 500 versions. The riddim was updated by Jammy in 2005 (slightly speeded up, with added horn riff) and this variation is known as "Sleng Teng Resurrection". Several new cuts on the original Sleng Teng were also released by Jammys in 2005 in celebration of the riddim's 20th anniversary. Some of Jammy's productions based on the rhythm were also released on the albums Sleng Teng Extravaganza and Sleng Teng Extravaganza 95.

King Tubby, who had originally taught Jammy how to produce music, was inspired by the track to create his own "Tempo" riddim.

Jammy recorded a number of other artists aside from Wayne Smith on the original backing track artists including Tenor Saw (with "Pumpkin Belly"), and Johnny Osbourne (with "Buddy Bye").

Notable reggae/dancehall kings Super Cat, Ninjaman, and Yellowman, as well as many more, have sampled their own versions of the Sleng Teng riddim.

International influence

British breakbeat hardcore group SL2 sampled the bass line for their UK hit rave track "Way in My Brain" in 1991.

American electronic duo Discovery uses a similar musical style in "Slang Tang" from their album LP in a nod to Sleng Teng.

British musician M.I.A. references Sleng Teng in the track "Pull Up the People" on her album Arular.

Wayne Smith's "Under Mi Sleng Teng" has also been used in the promotional trailer on British TV Channel 4 show This Is England '86.

The bass line of "Caress Me Down" by notable American reggae rock group Sublime features the famous Sleng Teng riddim from Wayne Smith's 1985 song "Under Mi Sleng Teng".

Swedish electronic artist Robyn references "Sleng Teng" in the track "Dancehall Queen" on her album Body Talk.

American rock band 311 also quote the lyrics in their song "Who's Got the Herb".

American dub reggae band TATANKA did two different takes of this riddim, one being an instrumental dub version called "Show Me Love" dub and the other a full-on instrumentation version complete with their own originally written lyrics and vocals.     

American hip-hop group Cypress Hill recorded a cover version of this song with them providing new verses of rap.

UB40 covered it on their 2018 album, A Real Labour of Love.

American hyperpop duo 100 gecs use a remixed version of the riddim for the song "The Most Wanted Person in the United States" from their 2023 album 10,000 Gecs

References

External links
 Sleng Teng Riddim at riddimguide.com
 Wayne Smith's Under Mi Sleng Teng – the song that revolutionised reggae

1985 singles
Riddims
Electronic songs
Reggae songs
1985 songs